The Big Easy Tour is a golf tour based in Southern Africa, founded in 2011. It is a developmental tour for the Sunshine Tour. The top five players earn Sunshine Tour cards, with those 6th–30th earning entry into the final stage of Sunshine Tour qualifying school. The tour is named after the nickname of South African golfer Ernie Els.

In 2017, three tournaments were co-sanctioned with the MENA Golf Tour.

From the start of 2018, tournaments attract Official World Golf Ranking points. Winners receive a minimum of 3 points for 54-hole tournaments and 5 points for 72-hole tournaments.

Order of Merit winners

References

External links

Professional golf tours
Sports leagues established in 2011
2011 establishments in Africa